The 4th Engineer Battalion is an engineer battalion in the Land Component of the Belgian Armed Forces.

Organisation
The 4th Engineer Battalion comprises:
 HQ staff
 CBRN company
 construction company
 light combat engineers company
 combat engineers company
 service company

External links
Section of the website of the Belgian Ministry of Defence about the 4th Engineer Battalion - Only available in French and Dutch.

Battalion, 4
Military units and formations established in 1913
1913 establishments in Belgium

Military units and formations of Belgium in World War II